Gammaretrovirus is a genus in the Retroviridae family. Example species are the murine leukemia virus and the feline leukemia virus. They cause various sarcomas, leukemias and immune deficiencies in mammals, reptiles and birds.

Introduction 
Many endogenous retroviruses, closely related to exogenous gammaretroviruses, are present in the DNA of mammals (including humans), birds, reptiles and amphibians. Many also share a conserved RNA structural element called a core encapsidation signal.

The avian reticuloendotheliosis viruses are not strictly avian viruses—it appears that reticuloendotheliosis viruses are mammalian viruses that were accidentally introduced into birds in the 1930s during research on malaria.

As a potential vector for gene therapy, gammaretroviruses have some advantages over HIV as a lentiviral vector. Specifically, the gammaretroviral packaging system does not require the incorporation of any sequences overlapping with coding sequences of gag, pol, or accessory genes.

Gammaretroviruses have a wide range of implications for animals. They have been linked with several diseases including cancer, specifically leukemias and lymphomas, various neurological diseases, and some immunodeficiencies in many different species. Gammaretroviruses are similar to other retroviruses and reverse transcribe a positive single strand RNA into double stranded DNA. The double stranded DNA is highly stable and easily integrated into a host genome. A few examples of the virus are Moloney murine leukemia virus, xenotropic MuLB-related virus, feline leukemia virus, and feline sarcoma virus.

Gammaretroviruses are very popular retroviral vectors in laboratory studies. These vectors are crucial for gene therapy and gene transfer. The reason that they are so useful is because their genomes are very simple and easy to use. Retroviruses have the ability to integrate into host cell genomes very well, which allows for the long term expression of their genome. One specific gammaretrovirus that is commonly used as a retroviral vector is the Moloney murine leukemia virus.

A specific gammaretrovirus called xenotropic murine leukemia virus-related virus (XMRV) has been found to infect prostate cancer tissue in laboratories. XMRV is a recombinant virus created in a laboratory accident in the mid-1990s. Although it can infect human tissue, no known disease is associated with the infection and it is unlikely to exist outside laboratories. Alleged discovery of XMRV in blood cells of patients with chronic fatigue syndrome in 2009 caused a controversy and eventual retraction. There were over 50 human cancer cell lines that were claimed to be linked to murine leukemia virus-related virus or murine leukemia virus. There have also been claimed discoveries of murine gammeretroviruses in lung cancer cell lines. While it was unclear what role these viruses have in the cancer development, it was believed that they are most prevalent during the tumor developing stage of the cancer by inhibiting tumor suppressing genes.

Viral classification 
Gammaretrovirus is a part of the retroviridae family. Gammaretroviruses are considered zoonotic viruses because they are found in many different mammalian species, such as mice, cats, pigs, primates, cows, and birds. However, bats are the primary reservoir for many gammaretroviruses. Bats can have a prolonged exposure to a variety of pathogens without showing any warning signs, which leads to the debated belief that bats have the ability to develop immunity to viruses that may harm other species. So, it is possible for bats to harbor not only one, but several types of gammaretroviruses. This claim is supported by a sequencing transcriptome profiling technique, and a polymerase chain reaction. Researchers also looked into several different types of bat species to solidify the claim that bats are the main reservoir for gammaretroviruses. The gammaretroviruses can be spread horizontally, animal to animal, or vertically from parent to offspring.

Another gammaretrovirus reservoir was discovered in the genome of the bottlenose dolphin. This gammaretrovirus called Tursiops truncates endogenous retrovirus, was thought to be from extant mammalian endogenous gammaretroviruses. The Tursiops truncates endogenous retrovirus original invasion dates back to approximately 10–19 million years ago, and was identified in killer whale endogenous gammaretrovirus which invaded over 3 million years ago. In 2009, another endogenous gammaretroviruses were detected in a species of killer whale, as well as nine other cetacean genomes. So gammaretrovirus genomes are present in both aquatic and terrestrial mammal species.

Structure 

Gammaretrovirus is a spherical, enveloped virion ranging from 80–100 nm in diameter. It contains a nucleocapsid, reverse-transcriptase, integrase, capsid, protease, envelope and surface units. The nucleocapsid is a nucleic acid protein assembly within the virus particle, it is a substructure of the virion. Reverse-transcriptase is the enzyme responsible for the transformation of RNA to DNA during the virion replication cycle. Integrase works with reverse transcriptase to convert RNA to DNA. The capsid is a protein shell that surrounds the genome of a virus particle, its main functions are to protect and deliver the genome to the host cell. The viral envelope is the membrane that surround the viral capsid, it is a host cell derived lipid bilayer.

Genome 

The genome of the gammaretrovirus is a single-stranded RNA (+) genome that is approximately 8.3 kb in size. It has a 5’ cap with a 3’ poly-A tail, and it contains two long terminal repeater regions at both the 5’ and 3’ ends. These long terminal repeat regions have the U5, R, and U3 regions as well as a polypurine tract at the 3’ end and a primer binding site at the 5’ end. The typical gammretrovirus genome contains the gag gene, pol gene, and an env gene.

Replication cycle
The gammaretrovirus will act as a parasite to use cellular host factors to deliver genome into a host's cell nucleus, where they will use the cell's machinery to replicate the viral genome and continue the spread throughout the host organism. Because it is a single-stranded RNA(+) with a DNA intermediate genome, it has the ability to copy its viral RNA genome directly into mRNA. Against the central dogma of biology, it also reversely transcribes its RNA genome into DNA.

Virion attach the host cell receptors via the SU glycoprotein, then the TM glycoprotein assists with fusion with the cell membrane. The virus will then begin uncoating, and a linear double-stranded DNA molecule is formed from the single-stranded RNA(+) genome via reverse transcription. The enzyme responsible for reverse transcription is reverse transcriptase. The host nuclear membrane is disassembled during mitosis and the viral double-stranded DNA is able to enter the host nucleus. Viral double-stranded DNA is then integrated into the host cell genome via viral integrase, an enzyme that allows for viral DNA integration into host DNA. The virus is now referred to as a provirus, which means the gammaretrovirus DNA has integrated into the host cell genome and is now the template for the formation of viral mRNA and genomic RNA. Double-stranded DNA is transcribed by Pol II and will produce both spliced and unspliced RNA strands, these spliced RNA strands will leave the host cell nucleus. The unspliced viral RNA translation produces env, gag, and gag-pol polyproteins. The Env becomes a polypeptide precursor and will cleave to produce a receptor binding surface. Next the virion is assembled in the host cell membrane, and the viral RNA genome is packaged. The virions bud from the plasma membrane and release into the host. After virions release from host cells the process is repeated on the next cell the active viral particle comes across.

Associated diseases and outbreaks 
Gammaretrovirus outbreaks are common in koalas. In fact, they have been linked to Koala Immune Deficiency Syndrome (KIDS), which is similar to human immunodeficiency syndrome. Koala Immune Deficiency Syndrome affects the immune system of various populations of koalas, leaving them more prone to becoming infected with diseases or diagnosed with cancer. Similar to HIV, Koala Immune Deficiency Syndrome can be passed on to offspring as well as be transmitted to other koalas or species on animals. The virus is common in captive koalas. In fact, in a population of captive koalas in Queensland 80% of the deaths are connected with gammaretroviruses. This colony is on high alert that their populations of koalas could be extinct in the near future, researchers are concerned that an epidemic may break out in Queensland.

Host restriction 
Vaccines have been discovered and provided for various gammaretroviruses. Namibia hosts the largest population of wild cheetahs in the world, making it a vital population for understanding the biology and natural behaviour of this species. In June 2002, researchers began testing animals for the presence of feline leukemia virus, since the concern arose that viral infection could cause a major health problem in Namibia's cheetah population. Through this testing, antibodies were collected to develop a feline leukemia virus vaccine. This vaccine has proven to be successful in the Namibian cheetahs, as 86% of the vaccinated cheetahs tested positive for the feline leukemia virus antibodies. With such a high vaccinated percentage, the cheetahs are in a condition where there's more than enough of the population that is vaccinated to prevent an outbreak of a gammaretrovius such as feline leukemia virus.

Along with vaccinations, host restriction of gammaretroviruses and other types of retroviruses are common among animals. Many hosts have a gene that blocks the replication cycle of retroviruses, including gammaretrovirus. This gene was discovered using a non-virulent protein of murine leukemia virus. This protein will block replication of some murine leukemia virus strains following reverse transcription. The restriction of the virus depends on the interaction of the protein and the invading virus.

References

External links

 Viralzone: Gammaretrovirus

Gammaretroviruses
Virus genera